The 2014 African Rally Championship was the 34th season of the African Rally Championship (ARC). This championship was the FIA regional zone rally championship for the African continent. The season began March 14 in Côte d'Ivoire, and ended November 9 in Madagascar, after eight events.

After a season long battle, Côte d'Ivoire driver Gary Chaynes won the championship by a single point from Zambian driver Mohamed Essa.

Event calendar and results

The 2014 African Rally Championship was as follows:

Championship standings
The 2014 African Rally Championship points were as follows:

References

External links

African Rally Championship
African
Rally Championship